Hauchard is a surname. Notable people with the surname include:

 Arnaud Hauchard (born 1971), French chess grandmaster
 Lucas Hauchard (born 1996), French YouTuber

See also
 Hatchard